The 2003 Andorran local elections were held on 14 December. Voters elected the council members of the seven parishes.

Electoral system
Voters elect the members of the municipal councils (consells de comú in Catalan). The electoral law allows the municipal councils to choose their numbers of seats, which must be an even number between 10 and 16.

All city council members were elected in single multi-member districts, consisting of the whole parish, using closed lists. Half of the seats were allocated to the party with the most votes. The other half of the seats were allocated using the Hare quota (including the winning party). With this system the winning party obtained an absolute majority.

The cònsol major (mayor) and the cònsol menor (deputy mayor) were elected indirectly by the municipal councillors.

Results

Overall 

The Liberal Party was the most voted party, winning in 5 out of 7 parishes. These results confirmed the establishment of a two-party system.

Canillo

Encamp

Ordino

La Massana

Andorra la Vella

Sant Julià de Lòria

Escaldes-Engordany

References

External links
Election results (Government of Andorra)

2003
Andorra
Local elections
Andorran local elections